Homecoming,  is a 2011 Singaporean and Malaysian comedy film directed by Lee Thean-jeen. It was Lee's debut feature film.

Plot
Ah Meng and his mother, Karen Neo, travel to Kuala Lumpur for a Chinese New Year reunion dinner.

Newly-wed couple Boon and Jamie aim to head off to Bali right after their family's reunion dinner, which cannot begin until all of the guests arrive.

Chef Daniel Koh neglects his daughter Mindy as he prepares dishes for customers. When his fiery temper results in the resignation of several assistant chefs, he requires the help of restaurant manager Fei Fei.

Cast
 Ah Niu as Ah Meng
 Jack Neo as Karen Neo
 Mark Lee as Daniel Koh
 Huang Wenhong as Boon
 Rebecca Lim as Jamie
 Koe Yeet as Mindy
 Jacelyn Tay as Fei Fei
 Afdlin Shauki as taxi driver

Release
It released in theatres in Singapore on 3 February 2011, the first day of Chinese New Year.

Reception
Yong Shu Hoong of My Paper rated the film 3.5 stars out of 5, writing "Of course, a little sentimentality is inevitable in a Chinese New Year comedy. And messages about the importance of family and tradition may, at times, border dangerously on heavy-handedness. Still, the overall effect is a wholesome feel-good movie that is not only well-paced, entertaining and (as its Chinese title suggests) brimming with laughter, but also has its heart in all the right places." Dylan Tan of The Business Times rated the film B+, calling it "heartfelt, well-made and well-observed". The Straits Times rated the film 2.5 stars out of five and 3.5 stars out of five for the festive index, stating "It is hard to quibble with the well-meaning sentiments here – the importance of family and spending time with them – but writer-director Lee Thean-jeen's debut feature feels a tad heavy-handed."

References

External links
 

2010 films
Malaysian comedy films
Singaporean comedy films